Lee Woo-bong (born 8 June 1935) is a South Korean former footballer who competed in the 1964 Summer Olympics.

References

External links
 
 

1935 births
Living people
South Korean footballers
Olympic footballers of South Korea
Footballers at the 1964 Summer Olympics
People from Chungju
Association football midfielders
Sportspeople from North Chungcheong Province